This is a list of commemorative plaques (including blue plaques) in the city of Coventry, England.

Coventry is a city full of rich culture and history with notable figures and events. Typically, notable figures and landmarks which mark the heritage of the city will have a blue plaque nearby to the landmark or statues. Chairman of the Coventry Society, Keith Draper, says, "All over the city, we have plaques of various shapes, sizes and colours that tell the story of prominent people and their achievements, and of important events". The list of plaques can be found below.

Plaques

References

External links 

 Plaques in Coventry on OpenPlaques

Coventry-related lists
Coventry